Good Morning Britain may refer to:

 Good Morning Britain (1983 TV programme), a programme on the TV-am breakfast television service between 1983 and 1992
 Good Morning Britain (2014 TV programme), the current ITV Breakfast programme, replacing Daybreak
 "Good Morning Britain" (song), a 1990 song by Aztec Camera

See also
 Good Morning Television, ITV TV programme
 Good Morning with Anne and Nick, BBC TV programme
 Good Morning Sunday, BBC Radio 2 show
 Good Morning Scotland, BBC Radio Scotland show
 Good Morning Ulster, BBC Radio Ulster show
 Good morning (disambiguation)